Mikko Yrjö Ilmari Kolehmainen (born 18 August 1964 in Mikkeli) is a Finnish sprint canoer who competed from the mid-1980s to the mid-1990s. Competing in four Summer Olympics, he won the gold medal in the K-1 500 m event at Barcelona in 1992. Kolehmainen's victory was Finland's only gold medal at those games.

By now established as Finland's strongest kayak sprinter, he concentrated in the K-1 500 m discipline. Although a respected competitor at international regattas he never really threatened the top paddlers for the major prizes. At the 1991 World Championships in Paris he finished a creditable seventh.

It was therefore a major shock when, at the Barcelona Olympics in 1992, he won the K-1 500 m gold medal. His victory over reigning champion Zsolt Gyulay of Hungary gave Finland their only gold medal of an otherwise disappointing Games.

A year later he showed that his Barcelona performance was no fluke by winning the world championship K-1 500 m title in Copenhagen. At his farewell Olympics, in Atlanta in 1996 he finished in seventh place, and carried the flag at the opening ceremony.

References

External links

1964 births
Living people
People from Mikkeli
Canoeists at the 1984 Summer Olympics
Canoeists at the 1988 Summer Olympics
Canoeists at the 1992 Summer Olympics
Canoeists at the 1996 Summer Olympics
Finnish male canoeists
Olympic canoeists of Finland
Olympic gold medalists for Finland
Olympic medalists in canoeing
ICF Canoe Sprint World Championships medalists in kayak
Medalists at the 1992 Summer Olympics
Sportspeople from South Savo